Theodore Alfred Livingston (February 18, 1913 – June 8, 1984) was an American football player who played professionally for four seasons in the National Football League (NFL) with the Cleveland Rams.

References

External links

1913 births
1984 deaths
American football guards
American football tackles
Cleveland Rams players
Indiana Hoosiers football players
People from Ellsworth, Kansas
People from Rice County, Kansas
Players of American football from Kansas